During the 1998–99 season Bologna F.C. competed in Serie A, Coppa Italia and UEFA Cup.

Season summary
Carlo Mazzone guided Bologna to the semi-finals of both the UEFA Cup and Coppa Italia, and ensured European qualification again after victory over Inter Milan in the play-offs. He then left for Perugia.

Kit
Bologna's kit was manufactured by Italian company Diadora and sponsored by Granarolo.

First-team squad
Squad at end of season

Transfers

Winter

Left club during season

Competitions

Serie A

League table

Results by round

Matches

Coppa Italia

Round of 32

Eightfinals

Quarterfinals

Semifinals

UEFA Cup qualification

Intertoto Cup

Third round

Semi-finals

Finals

UEFA Cup

First round

Bologna won 4–1 on aggregate.

Second round

Bologna won 4–1 on aggregate.

Third round

Bologna won 4–2 on aggregate.

Quarter-finals

Bologna won 3–2 on aggregate.

Semi-finals

Bologna 1–1 Marseille on aggregate. Marseille won on away goals.

Statistics

Players statistics

Left club during season

References

Sources
- RSSSF Italy Championship 1998/99

Bologna F.C. 1909 seasons
Bologna F.C. 1909